Tsen may refer to several Chinese language surname:

Surname 曾, see Zeng
Chiungtze C. Tsen, or Tsen Chiung-tze, Chinese mathematician 
Tsen rank
Tsen's theorem
 Linda Tsen, Malaysian politician

 surname 程, see Cheng (surname)
 Tsen Shui Fang, known for her WWII dairy in The Undaunted Women of Nanking: The Wartime Diaries of Minnie Vautrin and Tsen Shui-Fang published by Southern Illinois University Press

 surname 鄭, see Zheng (surname)
 Lindel Tsen, Chinese bishop of the Anglican Church in China